The Zapotec Totems are a semi-professional ice hockey team in Mexico City, Mexico. They play in the Liga Mexicana Élite.

History
The club founded in 2010, and joined the LME for the 2010-11 season. They finished in last place in the regular season, and did not qualify for the league playoffs.

Season-by-Season Results

Roster
G: Andres de la Garma #1
G: Agustin Grimaldi #2
D: Dior Miller #3 (C)
D: Aldo Shiavón #18
D: Francisco Padilla #8
D: Raúl Bonilla #11
D: Miguel Pórter #14 (A)
D: Emmanuel Cardozo #15
F: Eduardo Glennie #5
F: Oscar Flores #9
F: Alejandro Frade #10
F: Estéfano Bonfante #13
F: Roberto Sánchez #4
F: Ander Barberena #6 (A)
F: Juan Pablo Desayve #7
F: Jorge Ehlers #16
F: Roger Garza #12
F: Alejandro García #19
F: Sebastián Ortega #17

External links
Team profile on hockeymexico.com

Ice hockey teams in Mexico
Sports teams in Mexico City
Ice hockey clubs established in 2010
2010 establishments in Mexico